The 9th Virginia Cavalry Regiment was a cavalry regiment raised in Virginia for service in the Confederate States Army during the American Civil War. It fought mostly with the Army of Northern Virginia.

History
Virginia’s 9th Cavalry Regiment was formed in January, 1862, using John E. Johnson's eight company 1st Battalion, Virginia Cavalry ("Lee's Legion") as its nucleus. These companies and the two added were from the counties of Stafford, Caroline, Westmoreland, Lancaster, Essex, Spotsylvania, Lunenburg, King William, King George, and Richmond.

The unit served in W.H.F. Lee's, Chambliss', and Beale's Brigade, Army of Northern Virginia. It fought in the Seven Days' Battles and the conflicts at Gainesville, Second Manassas, Sharpsburg, Fredericksburg, Dumfries, Rapidan Station, Brandy Station, Upperville, Hanover, Gettysburg, Williamsport, Funkstown, and Culpeper Court House. The 9th went on to fight at Bristoe, Mine Run, The Wilderness, and Todd's Tavern. Later it skirmished around Richmond and Petersburg, then was active in the Appomattox operations.

This unit reported 32 casualties at Upperville, lost four percent of the 490 engaged at Gettysburg, and had 22 disabled at Williamsport. It surrendered 1 officer and 26 men. The field officers were Colonels Richard L. T. Beale, John E. Johnson, W.H.F. "Rooney" Lee, and Thomas Waller; Lieutenant Colonel Meriwether Lewis; and Major Samuel A. Swann.

See also

List of Virginia Civil War units

References

Further reading

Units and formations of the Confederate States Army from Virginia
1862 establishments in Virginia
1865 disestablishments in Virginia
Military units and formations established in 1862
Military units and formations disestablished in 1865